HD 27894 b is a gas giant with a mass at least two thirds that of Jupiter, or twice that of Saturn. The distance from the planet to the star is one third compared that of Mercury from the Sun, and it takes almost exactly 18 days to complete one roughly circular orbit.

References

External links
 

Exoplanets discovered in 2005
Giant planets
Reticulum (constellation)
Exoplanets detected by radial velocity

de:HD 27894 b